The depressor supercilii is an eye muscle of the human body. The nature of this muscle is in some dispute. Few printed anatomies include it (Netter, et al.) and many authorities consider it to be part of the orbicularis oculi muscle.

On the other hand, many dermatologists, ophthalmologists, and plastic surgeons hold that the depressor supercilii is a distinct muscle and has a definite, individual effect on the movement of the eyebrow and skin of the glabella.

Origin and insertion
The depressor supercilii originates on the medial orbital rim, near the lacrimal bone, and inserts on the medial aspect of the bony orbit, inferior to the corrugator supercilii. In some specimens it exhibits two heads and in others, only one.

See also
 Corrugator supercilii muscle

References

External links
 Illustration in Facial Action Coding System
  - "Botox Injections for Hyperfunctional Facial Lines"

Muscles of the head and neck